is a former Japanese football player.

Playing career
Yano was born in Sakai on October 29, 1980. In 1999, when he was a high school student, he joined J1 League club Verdy Kawasaki (later Tokyo Verdy). Although he played several matches as forward from first season, he could not play many matches. In 2002, he moved to J2 League club Ventforet Kofu. However he could hardly play in the match. In September 2002, he returned to Tokyo Verdy. However he could hardly play in the match and retired end of 2002 season. After 4 years blank, he came back as player at Japan Football League club FC Kariya. However he could hardly play in the match and retired end of 2008 season.

Club statistics

References

External links

1980 births
Living people
Association football people from Osaka Prefecture
People from Sakai, Osaka
Japanese footballers
J1 League players
J2 League players
Japan Football League players
Tokyo Verdy players
Ventforet Kofu players
FC Kariya players
Association football forwards